The 1990 SWAC men's basketball tournament was held March 7–9, 1990, at the Health and Physical Education Arena in Houston, Texas. Texas Southern defeated , 94–89 in the championship game, to gain an automatic berth to the NCAA tournament. The Tigers received the #14 seed in the Midwest region.

Bracket and results

References

1989–90 Southwestern Athletic Conference men's basketball season
SWAC men's basketball tournament